The 1996 European Tour was the 25th official season of golf tournaments known as the PGA European Tour.

The 1996 season saw co-sanctioning arrangements expand, with the PGA Tour of Australasia's Heineken Classic joining three Southern Africa Tour events on the schedule. The season was ultimately made up of 38 tournaments counting for the Order of Merit, and several non-counting "Approved Special Events".

The Order of Merit was won by Scotland's Colin Montgomerie for the fourth consecutive year.

Changes for 1996
There were several changes from the previous season, with the addition of the Heineken Classic, the Dimension Data Pro-Am and the Loch Lomond World Invitational; and the loss of the Turespaña Open De Canaria and the Open de Baleares. Soon after the schedule was announced, a third Southern Africa Tour event was added, the FNB Players Championship.

In January, the Jersey Open was moved onto the European Senior Tour schedule and the Open Mediterrania was replaced by the Catalan Open. In February, a new tournament in Spain, the Oki Pro-Am was added opposite the Dunhill Cup. In March, the Slaley Hall Northumberland Challenge was added to the schedule, taking the dates vacated by the Jersey Open, opposite the U.S. Open.

Schedule
The following table lists official events during the 1996 season.

Unofficial events
The following events were sanctioned by the European Tour, but did not carry official money, nor were wins official.

Order of Merit
The Order of Merit was titled as the Volvo Order of Merit and was based on prize money won during the season, calculated in Pound sterling.

Awards

See also
List of golfers with most European Tour wins

Notes

References

External links
1996 season results on the PGA European Tour website
1996 Order of Merit on the PGA European Tour website

European Tour seasons
European Tour